T Cygni is a binary star system in the northern constellation of Cygnus. It is a faint system but visible to the naked eye with a combined apparent visual magnitude of 4.93. It is moving closer to the Earth with a heliocentric radial velocity of −24 km/s.

The primary, component A, is a variable star, most likely of the slow irregular type, which ranges in magnitude from 4.91 down to 4.96. It is a giant star with a stellar classification of K3 III, which indicates it has exhausted the hydrogen at its core and evolved away from the main sequence. The star has expanded to 28 times the radius of the Sun. It is radiating 241 times the Sun's luminosity from its enlarged photosphere at an effective temperature of 4,285 K.

The secondary companion, component B, is a magnitude 10.03 star located at an angular separation of  along a position angle of 120°, as of 2012.

References

K-type giants
Slow irregular variables
Cygnus (constellation)
Durchmusterung objects
198134
102571
7956
Cygni, T